Bilambita Loy (Bengali: বিলম্বিত লয়) is a 1970 Bengali film directed by Agragami starring actors Uttam Kumar, Supriya Devi and Shyamal Ghoshal . Nachiketa Ghosh composed the music.

Plot 
A promising  singer  Supriya Devi fall in love in college.  After some time she  get married against their families' wishes. The singer then begins performing to support her husband Uttam Kumar and becomes very much renowned. On the other hand, the husband of the artist fails to earn a livelihood and becomes alcoholic. Later he got a shelter of a nurse.

Cast
 Uttam Kumar
 Supriya Choudhury,
  Deepa Chatterjee,
 Nirmal Kumar,
 Asit Baran, 
 Bimal Banerjee,
 Jyotsna Banerjee, 
 Balai Das,
 Arindam Gangopadhyay, 
 Tarun Kumar,
 Firoz Chowdhury 
 Shyamal Ghoshal.
 Arindam Ganguly

Soundtrack
All songs were composed by Nachiketa Ghosh and penned by Pulak Bandyopadhyay.

"Ek Baishakhe Dekha Holo Dujanay - Aarti Mukherjee
"Bendhona Phulomala Dore" - Manna Dey, Aarti Mukherjee
"Anka Banka Pathe Jodi" - Aarti Mukherjee
"Taap Chare To" - Manna Dey, Aarti Mukherjee
"Sona Roder Gaan" - Aarti Mukherjee

References

External links 
 

1970 films
Indian black-and-white films
Bengali films remade in other languages
Bengali-language Indian films
1970s Bengali-language films